Mario Andric (born 4 March 1998) is an Austrian professional footballer who plays as a left-back for Kufstein.

Career
Andric is a product of the youth academies of the Austrian clubs SV Thiersee, Kufstein, AKA Tirol, and Red Bull Salzburg, and the German club Kaiserslautern. He began his senior career with Kaiserslautern II in 2017. On 26 January 2019, he transferred to Wuppertaler SV. He moved back to Austria, with stints at Freiberg and Kufstein. On 17 May 2021, he transferred to WSG Tirol. He made his professional debut with WSG Tirol in a 2–1 Austrian Football Bundesliga loss to Austria Klagenfurt on 28 August 2021. He mutually terminated his contract with Tirol on 4 July 2022.

References

External links
 
 OEFB Profile

1998 births
People from Kufstein
Living people
Austrian footballers
Association football fullbacks
1. FC Kaiserslautern II players
Wuppertaler SV players
SGV Freiberg players
WSG Tirol players
Oberliga (football) players
Regionalliga players
Austrian Football Bundesliga players
2. Liga (Austria) players
Austrian Regionalliga players
Austrian expatriate footballers
Austrian expatriate sportspeople in Germany
Expatriate footballers in Germany